Teesdale School is a secondary school and sixth form with academy status located in Barnard Castle, County Durham, England. It offers subjects from GCSE to Advanced Subsidiary Level and Advanced Level.

Location
Teesdale School is located on the A688, on the outskirts of Barnard Castle, just north of the A66.

External links
Teesdale School official website

Secondary schools in County Durham
Academies in County Durham
Barnard Castle